Spencer Miller is a professional rugby league footballer who has played as a  or  in the 2000s and the 2010s. He has played at representative level for Scotland, and at club level for Whitehaven.

International honours
Miller won caps for Scotland while at Whitehaven in 2003 against Ireland and France, in 2004 against Wales and Ireland, and in 2006 against Wales.

References

External links
Rugby League news - June 2004
Widnes win ends faint Cas hopes
Crusaders 22-26 Whitehaven
Championship round-up - week 21

Living people
Place of birth missing (living people)
Rugby league locks
Rugby league second-rows
Scotland national rugby league team players
Whitehaven R.L.F.C. players
Year of birth missing (living people)